WJAW-FM (100.9 FM) is a radio station broadcasting a country music format. Licensed to Marietta, Ohio, United States.  The station is currently owned by Quiet Radio Inc.

References

External links
WMOA, WJAW, & WJAW-FM

JAW